Kristýna Napoleaová (born 12 April 1996) is a Czech professional golfer and former footballer with AC Sparta Prague. She was runner-up at the 2022 Aramco Saudi Ladies International.

Career
Napoleaová is a former football player of the Czech Republic women's national under-17 football team and a six-time champion of the Czech Women's U-15 and U-19 League with AC Sparta Prague. She took up golf in 2016 at the age of twenty, after an injury halted her football career. She turned professional just three and a half years later in 2020.

Napoleaová joined the LET Access Series in 2020, and she finished tied 4th at the 2021 Flumserberg Ladies Open. In 2021, she also played in six events on the Ladies European Tour. She made her first LET cut at the Tipsport Czech Ladies Open in the week of her fifth anniversary of starting with golf.

She finished tied 39th at LET Q-School to receive limited status for 2022, and had her breakthrough on the LET when she finished runner-up at the Aramco Saudi Ladies International, after sharing the halfway lead with eventual winner Georgia Hall.

Amateur wins
2018 Grabstejn Open

Source:

References

External links

Czech female golfers
Ladies European Tour golfers
Czech women's footballers
Women's association footballers not categorized by position
AC Sparta Praha (women) players
People from Pelhřimov
Sportspeople from Prague
1996 births
Living people